Atrophaneura luchti is a species of butterfly in the family Papilionidae. It is endemic to Indonesia (Java).

Atrophaneura luchti is restricted to the mountains in the far east of Java. Little is known about this species which closely 
resembles and may be a synonym of Atrophaneura priapus.

References

luchti
Endemic fauna of Indonesia
Butterflies of Java
Taxonomy articles created by Polbot